Alina Mykhailivna Kovalenko (born 1992, Kyiv) is a Ukrainian film and television actress, model.

Early life and education 
She was born on May 28, 1992 in Kyiv. She started her career as a model. She starred in several commercials and music videos.

In 2017, she graduated from the Ivan Karpenko-Kary Kyiv National University of Theater, Cinema and Television, Faculty of Acting. Alina's debut role in the cinema was the role of Svetlana in the TV series How the Steel Was Tempered. Received great fame thanks to the role of Olga Radzevich in the series of STB The Serf.

Career 
In December 2016, Kovalenko she became the main character of the clip of the Ukrainian singer Monatik for his single Eternity. In September 2017, she is starring of official video on Empire of the Sun's song On Our Way Home.

In 2019, Alina Kovalenko played the role of Rosana in the film The Rising Hawk.

Selected filmography

References

External links
 
 Профіль  на сайті телеканалу СТБ
 Alina Kovalenko at KinoPoisk

1992 births
Living people
Actors from Kyiv
21st-century Ukrainian actresses
Ukrainian film actresses
Ukrainian television actresses
Kyiv National I. K. Karpenko-Kary Theatre, Cinema and Television University alumni
Ukrainian female models